The Telford child sexual exploitation scandal was a scandal in the United Kingdom. Originally, a group of men were convicted of grooming local children for sex between 2007 and 2009 in Telford in the English county of Shropshire. While media reports had suggested 100 or more girls had been affected and around 200 perpetrators were suspected, the Sunday Mirror reported in March 2018 that up to 1,000 girls may have been abused, with some even murdered, in incidents dating back to the 1970s. Social workers and police cast doubt on this report, denying that Telford had a "discernible problem compared to other towns".

According to the Home Office, as of 2015, Telford had the highest rate of sex crimes against children of any town or city in the United Kingdom. Telford has a population of just under 170,000 people.

A report from a three-year inquiry into the child sexual exploitation was released in July 2022. It revealed more than 1,000 girls had been abused over a 40 year period, and that agencies blamed victims for the abuse they suffered, not the perpetrators, and some cases of exploitation were not investigated because of "nervousness about race". The report made 47 recommendations for improvement by agencies involved. West Mercia Police apologised "unequivocally" for past events as well as Telford and Wrekin Council. Victims were often blamed for "child prostitution" and offenders were emboldened by the lack of police action.

Overview
In a series of trials stretching over two years and concluding in May 2013, seven men were convicted of sexual offences against four girls aged 13 to 16. The offences included rape, controlling child prostitution, causing child prostitution, and trafficking for the purpose of prostitution.

In March 2018, investigations by the Sunday Mirror alleged that the extent of the Telford grooming gang was far more vast than had previously been believed, with claims of up to 1,000 girls, most of them white, having been victims of trafficking, drugging, beating, rape and even murder. Similar with other grooming gang cases, it was alleged that the authorities failed to keep details of abusers from Asian communities for fear of being seen as racist, with police having known about gang activities since the early 1980s.

Superintendent Tom Harding, the chief of West Mercia police, disputed the figures claimed by the Sunday Mirror. "I don't believe Telford has a discernible problem compared to other towns," he told the Shropshire Star. "Child sexual exploitation will be taking place all over the country, and Telford is not different to anywhere else. I'm confident we understand the scale of the problem here, and we have got the resources here to deal with it."

The claim of "mostly white girls being targeted due to their background" has also been significantly disputed. One social worker stated that they work with people from "all different backgrounds" and that it was not just girls who could be exploited, but that boys could be exploited in the same way of grooming. "We work with an age range of 13 to 19-year-olds, [and] we have females and [...] males [that] we support."

Harding also disputed claims that offenders were predominantly Asian. He reiterated that sexual offending in the town was no different proprionately from the larger breakdown of society.

Operation Chalice

West Mercia Police set up "Operation Chalice" to investigate allegations that local girls were being groomed. Officers believe that up to 100 girls were affected between 2007 and 2009.

According to a Channel 4 Dispatches investigation, "The Hunt for Britain's Sex Gangs" (2013), police were told that men in Telford would "ejaculate and then urinate in children's mouths". There were also allegations of "gang-rape by queues of men while girls were held hostage for hours, sometimes days—all the while being forced to listen to the screams of girls in other rooms with other men".

Convictions

2012 convictions

2019 convictions

Inquiry

Call for independent inquiry
On 26 October 2016, the Conservative MP for Telford, Lucy Allan, called for an independent inquiry. She said she had a meeting with a victim of the abuse, who told her that many of the worst offenders had not been prosecuted and were still living in the area. Allan said that she would be asking the then prime minister, Theresa May, to take action.

Investigations
The Telford case was one of several cases which prompted investigations looking into the claim that "the majority of the perpetrators have been British Pakistani"; the first was by the think tank Quilliam, which released a report in December 2017 entitled "Group Based Child Sexual Exploitation – Dissecting Grooming Gangs", which claimed 84% of offenders were of Pakistani heritage. However this report was fiercely criticised as having an unscientific nature and poor methodology by a child sexual exploitation expert Ella Cockbain and Waqas Tufail, in their paper "Failing Victims, Fuelling Hate: Challenging the Harms of the 'Muslim grooming gangs' Narrative" which was published in January 2020. Writing in ''The Guardian'', Cockbain and Tufail stated that "The two-year study by the Home Office makes very clear that there are no grounds for asserting that Muslim or Pakistani-heritage men are disproportionately engaged in such crimes, and, citing our research, it confirmed the unreliability of the Quilliam claim".

A further investigation carried out by the Home Office, the findings of which were published in December 2020, showed that child sexual exploitation groups were most commonly composed of white men and not British Pakistani men. It reports: "Research has found that group-based child sexual exploitation offenders are most commonly white. Some studies suggest an overrepresentation of black and Asian offenders relative to the demographics of national populations. However, it is not possible to conclude that this is representative of all group-based CSE offending."

Independent inquiry and report
A report that resulted from an independent inquiry chaired by Tom Crowther QC was released on 12 July 2022.  The report found that more than 1,000 girls had been abused over a 40 year period, and their abuse was ignored for decades due to "nervousness about race" in the belief that investigation against Asian men would inflame "racial tensions". It found that teachers and social workers were discouraged from reporting child sexual abuse, and authorities tended to blame the children instead of the perpetrators, dismissing reports of child exploitation as "child prostitution". The report also concluded that information was not properly shared between agencies.

Speaking after the publication of the report, West Mercia Police's Assistant Chief Constable, Richard Cooper said he was embarrassed to acknowledge the failures of the past, but insisted there was now a very different approach. "The victims are seen as victims and we are absolutely dedicated to the protection of children," he told reporters. "There was not the cohesion that there is today. We have set up teams incorporating police and other agencies."

See also
Murder of the Lowe family – 2000 murder of a child sexual abuse victim and her family in Telford, later brought up to scare other victims into silence

References

2010 crimes in the United Kingdom
2010 in England
21st century in Shropshire
British people convicted of child sexual abuse
Child prostitution in the United Kingdom
Child sexual abuse in England
Crime in Shropshire
Forced prostitution
Human trafficking in the United Kingdom
Incidents of violence against girls
Pakistani-British gangs
Rape in England
Sex crimes in England
Sex gangs
Sex trafficking
Street gangs
Child sexual exploitation scandal